The Killdeer Formation is a geologic formation in North Dakota. It preserves fossils dating back to the Neogene.

See also

 List of fossiliferous stratigraphic units in North Dakota
 Paleontology in North Dakota

References
 

Geologic formations of North Dakota